|}

The Critérium de Saint-Cloud is a Group 1 flat horse race in France open to two-year-old thoroughbred colts and fillies. It is run at Saint-Cloud over a distance of 2,000 metres (about 1¼ miles), and it is scheduled to take place each year in late October or early November.

History
The event was established in 1901, and it was originally held in September. It was initially contested over 1,400 metres, and was extended to 2,000 metres in 1906.

The race was abandoned throughout World War I, with no running from 1914 to 1919. It was cut to 1,600 metres in 1920, and restored to 2,000 metres in 1924.

Due to the closure of its venue during World War II, the Critérium de Saint-Cloud was not run from 1939 to 1945. It was staged at Longchamp in 1954.

The present system of race grading was introduced in 1971, and the Critérium de Saint-Cloud was given Group 2 status. It was promoted to Group 1 level in 1987.

Prior to 2015 the event was run in mid-November and was Europe's last Group 1 flat race of the year. In 2015 it was moved to a date a week earlier as part of a series of changes to autumn races for two-year-olds and is now run on the same day as another Group 1 race, the Critérium International.

Records
Leading jockey (6 wins):
 Yves Saint-Martin – Fire Crest (1967), Rheffic (1970), Ribecourt (1973), Tarek (1977), Darshaan (1983), Mouktar (1984)
 Dominique Boeuf – Pistolet Bleu (1990), Glaieuil (1991), Marchand de Sable (1992), Spadoun (1998), Goldamix (1999), Voix du Nord (2003)

Leading trainer (8 wins):
 François Mathet – Telegram (1949), Bingo (1952), Pas de Deux (1955), Upstart (1957), Le Francais (1960), Saraca (1968), Rheffic (1970), Simbir (1972)

Leading owner (5 wins): (includes part ownership)
 Sue Magnier – Ballingarry (2001), Alberto Giacometti (2002), Fame and Glory (2008), Recital (2010), Waldgeist (2016)

Winners since 1978

Earlier winners

 1901: Illinois
 1902: Marigold
 1903: Maidensblush
 1904: Fier
 1905: Belle Fleur
 1906: La Belle
 1907: Talo Biribil
 1908: Clinquant
 1909: Hunyade
 1910: Matchless
 1911: Mongolie
 1912: La Ribaude
 1913: Regent's Park
 1914–19: no race
 1920: Black Larry
 1921: Rocking Chair
 1922: Sylvan
 1923: Fetz el Rih
 1924: Sizain
 1925: Becassine
 1926: Eneas
 1927: Motrico
 1928: Cordial
 1929: La Voulzie
 1930: Barneveldt
 1931: De Beers / Incessu Patuit *
 1932: Amador
 1933: El Lando
 1934: Skiff
 1935: Treignac
 1936: Tonnelle
 1937: Canot
 1938: Tricameron
 1939–45: no race
 1946: Rhetorius
 1947:
 1948:
 1949: Telegram
 1950: Aquino
 1951:
 1952: Bingo
 1953: Sica Boy
 1954: Ahmose
 1955: Pas de Deux
 1956: Lofoten
 1957: Upstart
 1958: Le Loup Garou
 1959: Marella
 1960: Le Francais
 1961: Tracy
 1962: Ad Valorem
 1963: Le Fabuleux
 1964: Carvin
 1965: Sea Hawk
 1966: Pointille
 1967: Fire Crest
 1968: Saraca
 1969: Stintino
 1970: Rheffic
 1971: Gay Saint
 1972: Simbir
 1973: Ribecourt
 1974: Easy Regent
 1975: Kano
 1976: Conglomerat
 1977: Tarek

* The 1931 race was a dead-heat and has joint winners.

See also
 List of French flat horse races

References

 France Galop / Racing Post:
 galop.courses-france.com:
 1901–1919, 1920–1949, 1950–1979, 1980–present
 france-galop.com – A Brief History: Critérium de Saint-Cloud.
 galopp-sieger.de – Critérium de Saint-Cloud.
 ifhaonline.org – International Federation of Horseracing Authorities – Critérium de Saint-Cloud (2019).
 pedigreequery.com – Critérium de Saint-Cloud – Saint-Cloud.

Flat horse races for two-year-olds
Saint-Cloud Racecourse
Horse races in France
Recurring sporting events established in 1901
1901 establishments in France